Édgar Yoel Bárcenas Herrera (born 23 October 1993) is a Panamanian professional footballer who plays as a winger for Liga MX club Mazatlán and the Panama national team.

Club career
Born in Colón, Bárcenas made his senior debut with hometown side Árabe Unido on 29 July 2012, coming on as a substitute in a 2–2 away draw against Plaza Amador. He scored his first goal for the club on 1 February 2014, netting the game's only in a home defeat of San Francisco.

On 15 January 2016, Bárcenas was loaned to Croatian side RNK Split for six months. After appearing rarely, he returned to Árabe Unido before joining Ascenso MX side Cafetaleros de Tapachula on 23 January 2017, also in a temporary deal.

On 26 December 2017, Bárcenas joined Cafetaleros permanently, with a deal to Tijuana arranged in the following July. On 18 July 2018, however, he was loaned to Segunda División side Real Oviedo for one year. On 9 August 2019, Bárcenas' loan was extended for a further campaign.

On 5 October 2020, Bárcenas joined Girona on loan. The following 8 August, he moved to fellow second division team CD Leganés also in a temporary deal.

In June 2022 Liga MX club Mazatlán announced they had signed Bárcenas to a deal.

International career
Bárcenas made his full international debut for Panama on 6 August 2014, in a 3–0 loss against Peru. After featuring for under-23 side in the 2015 Pan American Games, he was included in Hernán Darío Gómez's squads for the 2017 Copa Centroamericana and the 2017 CONCACAF Gold Cup.

On 14 May 2018, Bárcenas was named in Panama's preliminary 35-man squad for the 2018 FIFA World Cup in Russia, and was also among the final squad announced on 30 May. He appeared in all matches of the tournament, as Panama was knocked out in the group stage.

Career statistics

International

International goals
Scores and results list Panama's goal tally first.

Honours
Cafetaleros de Tapachula
 Ascenso MX: Clausura 2018
 Campeón de Ascenso
 Winners: 2017–18

References

External links
 
  
 
 
 

1993 births
Living people
Sportspeople from Colón, Panama
Panamanian footballers
Association football wingers
Liga Panameña de Fútbol players
C.D. Árabe Unido players
Croatian Football League players
RNK Split players
Ascenso MX players
Cafetaleros de Chiapas footballers
Club Tijuana footballers
Segunda División players
Real Oviedo players
Girona FC players
CD Leganés players
Pan American Games competitors for Panama
Footballers at the 2015 Pan American Games
2017 CONCACAF Gold Cup players
2018 FIFA World Cup players
2019 CONCACAF Gold Cup players
2021 CONCACAF Gold Cup players
Panama international footballers
Panamanian expatriate footballers
Expatriate footballers in Croatia
Expatriate footballers in Mexico
Expatriate footballers in Spain
Panamanian expatriate sportspeople in Croatia
Panamanian expatriate sportspeople in Mexico
Panamanian expatriate sportspeople in Spain